Glen Richey is an unincorporated community in Clearfield County, Pennsylvania, United States. Glen Richey has a post office with ZIP code 16837.

References

Unincorporated communities in Clearfield County, Pennsylvania
Unincorporated communities in Pennsylvania